Michael Ricci (born October 27, 1971) is a Canadian former professional ice hockey centre who played 16 seasons in the National Hockey League (NHL) for the Philadelphia Flyers, Quebec Nordiques, Colorado Avalanche, San Jose Sharks and Phoenix Coyotes.

Ricci currently serves in the Sharks front office as a scout & development coach.

Playing career
Ricci was born and raised in the Toronto suburb of Scarborough, Ontario. He attended St. Maximilian Kolbe Catholic school and Dr. Norman Bethune Collegiate Institute. As a youth, he played in the 1984 Quebec International Pee-Wee Hockey Tournament with a minor ice hockey team from Mississauga. He was a 2nd round pick of the Ontario Hockey League's Peterborough Petes in 1987 after a strong season with the Toronto Marlboros Bantams.

Ricci was also a talented soccer player growing up playing for the Scarborough Blues program with his cousin, Paul Peschisolido, who went on to a solid international career. Ricci's father Mario was a professional soccer player in Italy before emigrating to Canada.

Ricci was selected in the 1st Round 4th overall by the Philadelphia Flyers in the 1990 NHL Entry Draft. He had just completed three stellar seasons with the Peterborough Petes, and was dubbed a cannot-miss prospect. Ricci lasted only two years in Philadelphia, as in the summer of 1992 he was traded to the Quebec Nordiques in the Eric Lindros trade. He had a career year in his first season with the Nordiques, scoring 78 points. The next season, 1993–94, he scored a career-high 30 goals, with 5 of those coming in one game against the San Jose Sharks. In 1996, Ricci and the Colorado Avalanche won the Stanley Cup following the franchise's relocation from Quebec. On November 21, 1997, Ricci began a new endeavor with the Sharks.

Ricci quickly became an elite defensive centreman with San Jose, but never was able to regain the offensive prowess of his earlier years. Ricci was an essential cog to San Jose's success, and was there when the team made its first trip to the Western Conference Final in 2004. San Jose fans admired Ricci for his gritty style of play and were saddened when he was let go.

In 2005, Ricci switched his uniform number to 40 in honor of former National Football League (NFL) player Pat Tillman, who was killed in action while serving for the U.S. Army. The two had met in San Jose. Ricci played the 2005–06 season with the Phoenix Coyotes.

On August 13, 2007, he announced his retirement after telling The Peterborough Examiner that he had not recovered from neck surgery as well as he had hoped.

Post-playing career
Ricci rejoined the Sharks organization in the 2007–08 season as an advisor, and was introduced at the Sharks' rescheduled Opening Night festivities on October 18, 2007. He is actively involved in the Sharks Alumni Foundation.

On December 11, 2019, Ricci was named an assistant coach for the Sharks.

Acting
Ricci had a bit-part as Elmer Lach in the 2005 Quebec film The Rocket, about the life of Maurice Richard. Out of several NHL players who appear in the film, Ricci and Sean Avery are the only ones with any dialogue.

Personal life
Ricci and his wife Beth, who is from Peterborough, Ontario, were married July 4, 1998. They have three children. Son Mario is a talented baseball player. Ricci is an accomplished soccer player, fisherman, and avid fan of the NFL's San Francisco 49ers.  He owns property in Los Gatos, CA and a lakeside cottage in Haliburton, Ontario, Canada.

Records
 Ricci held the San Jose Sharks' franchise record for consecutive games played at 228 (later surpassed by Patrick Marleau).

Career statistics

Regular season and playoffs

International

Awards and honours

See also
List of NHL players with 1000 games played

References

External links
 
 

1971 births
Living people
Canadian ice hockey centres
Colorado Avalanche players
National Hockey League first-round draft picks
Peterborough Petes (ice hockey) players
Philadelphia Flyers draft picks
Philadelphia Flyers players
Phoenix Coyotes players
Quebec Nordiques players
San Antonio Rampage players
San Jose Sharks personnel
San Jose Sharks coaches
San Jose Sharks players
Sportspeople from Scarborough, Toronto
Ice hockey people from Toronto
Stanley Cup champions
Canadian people of Italian descent
Canadian ice hockey coaches